Pepeljevac may refer to:

 Pepeljevac (Kruševac), a village in Serbia
 Pepeljevac (Kuršumlija), a village in Serbia
 Pepeljevac (Lajkovac), a village in Serbia